Abitibi-Ouest Regional County Municipality (English: Abitibi West) is a regional county municipality located in the Abitibi-Témiscamingue region of Quebec. Its seat is La Sarre.

Subdivisions
There are 23 subdivisions within the RCM:

Cities & Towns (3)
 Duparquet
 La Sarre
 Macamic

Municipalities (15)
 Authier
 Authier-Nord
 Chazel
 Clerval
 Dupuy
 Gallichan
 La Reine
 Normétal
 Palmarolle
 Poularies
 Rapide-Danseur
 Roquemaure
 Sainte-Germaine-Boulé
 Taschereau
 Val-Saint-Gilles

Parishes (2)
 Sainte-Hélène-de-Mancebourg
 Saint-Lambert

Townships (1)
 Clermont

Unorganized Territory (2)
 Lac-Duparquet
 Rivière-Ojima

Demographics

Population

Language

Transportation

Access Routes
Highways and numbered routes that run through the municipality, including external routes that start or finish at the county border:

 Autoroutes
 None

 Primary Highways
 
 

 Secondary Highways
 
 
 

 External Routes

Attractions and other areas
 Antoine Marsh (Roquemaure)
 Calamite Covered Bridge [1927] (La Sarre)
 Culture House (La Sarre)
 Interpretation de la foresterie Centre (La Sarre) 
 La Salle Airport (Clermont)
 Leclerc Covered Bridge [1927] (La Sarre)
 l'Ile Covered Bridge [1946] (Clerval)
 Joseph Berube Collection (Gallichan)
 Molesworth Covered Bridge [1930] (Macamic Ville) 
 Notre-Dame-des-pauvres Sanctuary (Dupuy)
 Petit-Quatre Covered Bridge [1950] (Clermont)
 Rang 11 School (Authier)
 Rapide-Danseur Church (1942) (Rapide Danseur) 
 Sang-Neuf-Art Gallery (Palmarolle)

Protected areas
Aiguebelle National Park

See also
 List of regional county municipalities and equivalent territories in Quebec

References

External links
MRC d'Abitibi-Ouest

Regional county municipalities in Abitibi-Témiscamingue
Census divisions of Quebec